The Rydsgård Runestone, designated as DR 277 under Rundata, is located in the woods just outside the park at Rydsgård manor, which is near Skurup, Skåne, Sweden.

Description
The Rydsgård Runestone is classified as being carved in runestone style RAK. Similar to the Velanda Runestone, the inscription describes the deceased as being a good þegn, or thegn. The exact role of thegns in southern Sweden is a matter of debate, but the most common view is that these persons constituted a Nordic elite somehow connected to Danish power. It is thought that thegn-stones point to areas where they came from. From such power centres they could be sent forth to rule border areas in so-called tegnebyar.

Inscription

Transliteration into Latin characters
× kata × karþi × kuml × þausi × iftiʀ × suin × baluks ¶ sun × bunta × sin × saʀ × uas × þiakna × furstr

Transcription into Old Norse
Káta gerði kuml þessi eptir Svein Bôllungs son, bónda sinn. Sá var þegna fyrstr.

Translation in English
Káta made this monument in memory of Sveinn Bôllungr's son, her husbandman. He was first among þegns.

References

Runestones in Scania
10th-century inscriptions